Emson is a surname. Notable people with the surname include:
 Paul Emson (born 1958), English footballer
 Reginald Emson (1912–1995), British air marshal

See also
 Elson
 Emmson